This is a list of The Sims games and their expansion packs, usually developed by Maxis and published by Electronic Arts.

The Sims era

Base game 
 The Sims (2000; Microsoft Windows, Classic Mac OS, macOS)

Expansion packs 

 The Sims: Livin' Large (The Sims: Livin' It Up in the UK, Ireland and Portugal)
 The Sims: House Party
 The Sims: Hot Date
 The Sims: Vacation (The Sims: On Holiday in the UK, Ireland, China and Portugal)
 The Sims: Unleashed
 The Sims: Superstar
 The Sims: Makin' Magic

Compilation packs 
 The Sims Deluxe Edition
 The Sims Double Deluxe
 The Sims Mega Deluxe
 The Sims Triple Deluxe (UK and Ireland only)
 The Sims Complete Collection (The Sims: Full House in Australia, New Zealand and South Africa)
 The Sims Expansion Collection
 The Sims Expansion Three-Pack

Console edition 
 The Sims (PlayStation 2, GameCube, Xbox)

Spin-offs 
 The Sims Online (2002)
 The Sims Bustin' Out (2003; PlayStation 2, GameCube, Xbox, N-Gage, Game Boy Advance)
 The Urbz: Sims in the City (2004; GameCube, PlayStation 2, Xbox, Game Boy Advance, Nintendo DS)

The Sims 2

Base game 
 The Sims 2 (2004; Microsoft Windows, macOS)

Expansion packs 

 The Sims 2: University
 The Sims 2: Nightlife
 The Sims 2: Open for Business
 The Sims 2: Pets
 The Sims 2: Seasons
 The Sims 2: Bon Voyage
 The Sims 2: FreeTime
 The Sims 2: Apartment Life

Stuff packs 
 The Sims 2: Holiday Party Pack (The Sims 2: Christmas Party Pack in the UK and Ireland)
 The Sims 2: Family Fun Stuff
 The Sims 2: Glamour Life Stuff'
 The Sims 2: Happy Holiday Stuff (The Sims 2: Festive Holiday Stuff in the UK and Ireland)
 The Sims 2: Celebration! Stuff The Sims 2: H&M Fashion Stuff The Sims 2: Teen Style Stuff The Sims 2: Kitchen & Bath Interior Design Stuff The Sims 2: IKEA Home Stuff The Sims 2: Mansion & Garden Stuff Editions and compilation packs 
 The Sims 2: Special DVD Edition The Sims 2: Holiday Edition (2005) The Sims 2: Holiday Edition (2006) The Sims 2: Deluxe The Sims 2: Double Deluxe The Sims 2: University Life Collection The Sims 2: Best of Business Collection The Sims 2: Fun with Pets Collection The Sims 2: Ultimate Collection Console and mobile editions 
 The Sims 2 (GameCube, PlayStation 2, Xbox, Game Boy Advance, Nintendo DS, PlayStation Portable, Mobile)
 The Sims 2: Pets (Wii, GameCube, PlayStation 2, Game Boy Advance, Nintendo DS, PlayStation Portable)
 The Sims 2: Castaway (2007; Wii, PlayStation 2, PlayStation Portable, Nintendo DS, Mobile)
 The Sims 2: Apartment Pets (2008; Nintendo DS)
 The Sims DJ (2008; iPod)
 The Sims Bowling (2008; iPod)
 The Sims Pool (2008; iPod)

 The Sims Stories 

 The Sims Life Stories (2007; Microsoft Windows, macOS)
 The Sims Pet Stories (2007; Microsoft Windows, macOS)
 The Sims Castaway Stories (2008; Microsoft Windows, macOS)

 MySims 
 MySims (2008; Microsoft Windows, Wii, Nintendo DS)
 MySims Kingdom (2008; Wii, Nintendo DS)
 MySims Party (2009; Wii, Nintendo DS)
 MySims Racing (2009; Wii, Nintendo DS)
 MySims Agents (2009; Wii, Nintendo DS)
 MySims SkyHeroes (2010; Wii, Nintendo DS, PlayStation 3, Xbox 360)

 The Sims 3 
 Base game 
 The Sims 3 (2009; Microsoft Windows, macOS)

 Expansion packs 

 The Sims 3: World Adventures The Sims 3: Ambitions The Sims 3: Late Night The Sims 3: Generations The Sims 3: Pets The Sims 3: Showtime The Sims 3: Supernatural The Sims 3: Seasons The Sims 3: University Life The Sims 3: Island Paradise The Sims 3: Into the Future Stuff packs 
 The Sims 3: High-End Loft Stuff The Sims 3: Fast Lane Stuff The Sims 3: Outdoor Living Stuff The Sims 3: Town Life Stuff The Sims 3: Master Suite Stuff The Sims 3: Katy Perry's Sweet Treats The Sims 3: Diesel Stuff The Sims 3: 70s, 80s, & 90s Stuff The Sims 3: Movie Stuff Store DLC worlds 
 The Sims 3: Riverview (free download)
 The Sims 3: Barnacle Bay The Sims 3: Hidden Springs The Sims 3: Lunar Lakes The Sims 3: Lucky Palms The Sims 3: Sunlit Tides The Sims 3: Monte Vista The Sims 3: Aurora Skies The Sims 3: Dragon Valley The Sims 3: Midnight Hollow The Sims 3: Roaring Heights Compilation packs 
 The Sims 3 Collector's Edition The Sims 3 Holiday Collector's Edition The Sims 3 Commemorative Edition The Sims 3 Deluxe The Sims 3 Starter Pack Console and handheld editions 
 The Sims 3 (iOS, Android, Mobile, Blackberry Curve)
 The Sims 3 (Nintendo DS, Wii, PlayStation 3, Xbox 360, Nintendo 3DS)
 The Sims 3: World Adventures (iOS, Mobile)
 The Sims 3: Ambitions (iOS, Mobile)
 The Sims 3: Pets (Xbox 360, PlayStation 3, Nintendo 3DS)
 The Sims 3: Supernatural (Blackberry Curve)

 The Sims Medieval 
 The Sims Medieval (2011; Microsoft Windows, macOS)
 The Sims Medieval: Pirates and Nobles The Sims Medieval Deluxe Edition The Sims Medieval (iOS, Windows Phone)

 The Sims Social 
 The Sims Social (2011)

 The Sims FreePlay  The Sims FreePlay (2011; iOS, Android, Windows Phone, BlackBerry 10)

 The Sims 4 
 Base game 
 The Sims 4 (2014; Microsoft Windows, macOS, PlayStation 4, Xbox One)

 Expansion packs 

 The Sims 4: Get to Work The Sims 4: Get Together The Sims 4: City Living The Sims 4: Cats & Dogs The Sims 4: Seasons The Sims 4: Get Famous The Sims 4: Island Living  The Sims 4: Discover University  The Sims 4: Eco Lifestyle  The Sims 4: Snowy Escape  The Sims 4: Cottage Living The Sims 4: High School Years The Sims 4: Growing Together Game packs 

 The Sims 4: Outdoor Retreat The Sims 4: Spa Day The Sims 4: Dine Out The Sims 4: Vampires The Sims 4: Parenthood The Sims 4: Jungle Adventure The Sims 4: StrangerVille The Sims 4: Realm of Magic The Sims 4: Star Wars: Journey to Batuu The Sims 4: Dream Home Decorator The Sims 4: My Wedding Stories The Sims 4: Werewolves Stuff packs 
 The Sims 4: Luxury Party Stuff The Sims 4: Perfect Patio Stuff The Sims 4: Cool Kitchen Stuff The Sims 4: Spooky Stuff The Sims 4: Movie Hangout Stuff The Sims 4: Romantic Garden Stuff The Sims 4: Kids Room Stuff The Sims 4: Backyard Stuff The Sims 4: Vintage Glamour Stuff The Sims 4: Bowling Night Stuff The Sims 4: Fitness Stuff The Sims 4: Toddler Stuff The Sims 4: Laundry Day Stuff The Sims 4: My First Pet Stuff The Sims 4: Moschino Stuff The Sims 4: Tiny Living Stuff The Sims 4: Nifty Knitting Stuff The Sims 4: Paranormal Stuff Kits 
 The Sims 4: Throwback Fit Kit The Sims 4: Country Kitchen Kit The Sims 4: Bust the Dust Kit The Sims 4: Courtyard Oasis Kit The Sims 4: Industrial Loft Kit The Sims 4: Fashion Street Kit The Sims 4: Incheon Arrivals Kit The Sims 4: Blooming Rooms Kit The Sims 4: Modern Menswear Kit The Sims 4: Carnaval Streetwear Kit The Sims 4: Decor to the Max Kit The Sims 4: Moonlight Chic Kit The Sims 4: Little Campers Kit The Sims 4: First Fits Kit The Sims 4: Desert Luxe Kit The Sims 4: Pastel Pop Kit The Sims 4: Everyday Clutter Kit The Sims 4: Bathroom Clutter Kit The Sims 4: Simtimates Collection Kit Free pack 
 The Sims 4: Holiday Celebration Pack Editions 
 The Sims 4: Limited Edition The Sims 4: Digital Deluxe (The Sims 4: Deluxe Party Edition for PlayStation 4 and Xbox One)
 The Sims 4: Premium Edition The Sims 4: Collector's Edition The Sims 4: Legacy Edition The Sims Mobile  The Sims Mobile'' (2017; iOS, Android)

See also 
 List of Sim video games
 List of Maxis games

References

External links 

The Sims
Sims, The
Electronic Arts games